Gore Pass (el. 2903 m./9527 ft.) is a high mountain pass in the Rocky Mountains of northwestern Colorado in the United States.

The pass crosses a gap in the northern end of the Gore Range in southwestern Grand County west of Kremmling. The pass provides the route of State Highway 134 east of Toponas, furnishing a motor vehicle route between Middle Park and the valley of the Yampa River to the west. It has a mild approach to the west, while the east side has a moderate 5.4% grade.

Gore Pass is named for Sir St. George Gore, an Irish baronet from Sligo whose sole purpose was to break records and fill his trophy room.  In 1975, there was a sign on Colorado State Road Hwy 84 which read "GORE PASS, Altitude 9,000 feet.  Here in 1855 crossed Sir St. George Gore, an Irish baronet bent on the slaughter of game and guided by Jim Bridger.  For three years he scoured Colorado, Montana, and Wyoming, accompanied usually by fort men, many carts, wagons, hounds, and unexampled camp luxuries.  More than 2,000 buffalo, 1,600 deer and elk, and 100 bears were massacred for sport."  Readers are referred to pages 305-312 of the book, "The Trail of Tears (The Story of the American Indian Removals 1813-1855" by Gloria Jahoda, 1975.

The Rock Creek Stage Station, at Gore Pass, is a historic log building which is listed on the National Register of Historic Places.

References

External links
USGS TopoZone listing

Mountain passes of Colorado
Landforms of Grand County, Colorado
Transportation in Grand County, Colorado